Night Out is a 1989 Australian drama film directed by Lawrence Johnston. It was screened in the Un Certain Regard section at the 1990 Cannes Film Festival.

Cast
 Colin Batrouney as Tony
 David Bonney as Steve
 John Brumpton
 Luke Elliot
 Andrew Larkins
 Tom Sherlock
 Matthew Willis

References

External links

1989 films
1989 drama films
1989 short films
1989 LGBT-related films
Australian drama short films
Australian LGBT-related films
LGBT-related short films
LGBT-related drama films
1980s English-language films
1980s Australian films